Andrew Raymond Sullivan   (August 30, 1884 – February 14, 1920) was a Major League Baseball shortstop.  He attended Fordham University.

Sources

1884 births
1920 deaths
Baseball players from Massachusetts
Major League Baseball shortstops
Boston Beaneaters players
Manchester (minor league baseball) players
Nashua (minor league baseball) players
Fall River Indians players
Fordham University alumni
People from Southborough, Massachusetts
Sportspeople from Worcester County, Massachusetts